Thierry Carcenac (born 19 December 1950) is a member of the National Assembly of France.  He represents the Tarn department,  and is a member of the Socialiste, radical, citoyen et divers gauche.

References

1950 births
Living people
People from Tarn (department)
Socialist Party (France) politicians
Deputies of the 11th National Assembly of the French Fifth Republic
Deputies of the 12th National Assembly of the French Fifth Republic
Deputies of the 13th National Assembly of the French Fifth Republic
French Senators of the Fifth Republic
Senators of Tarn (department)